Neeld is a surname. Notable people with the surname include:

Greg Neeld (born 1955), Canadian ice hockey player
John Neeld (1805–1891), British politician
Joseph Neeld (1789–1856), British politician
Mark Neeld (born 1971), Australian rules footballer

See also
Neeld baronets
Neeld station